Francis in the Haunted House is a 1956 American comedy film from Universal-International, produced by Robert Arthur, directed by Charles Lamont, that stars Mickey Rooney and Virginia Welles.

This is the seventh and final film in Universal-International Francis the Talking Mule series, notably without series director Arthur Lubin, star Donald O'Connor, or Francis' voice actor Chill Wills.

Plot
Francis witnesses a murder and then befriends bumbling reporter David Prescott (Mickey Rooney), who may be next in line. With Francis' help and guidance, Prescott uncovers a mystery involving murder, an inheritance, and a spooky old mansion on the edge of town.

Cast

 Mickey Rooney as David Prescott
 Virginia Welles as Lorna MacLeod
 James Flavin as Police Chief Martin
 Paul Cavanagh as Neil Frazer
 Mary Ellen Kay as Lorna Ann
 David Janssen as Police Lieutenant Hopkins
 Ralph Dumke as Mayor Hargrove
 Richard Gaines as D.A. Reynolds
 Richard Deacon as Jason
 Dick Winslow as Sergeant Arnold
 Charles Horvath as Malcolm
 Timothy Carey as Hugo
 Helen Wallace as Mrs. MacPherson
 Edward Earle as Howard Grisby
 John Maxwell as Edward Ryan
 Glen Kramer as Ephraim Biddle
 Molly as Francis (as Francis the Talking Mule)
 Paul Frees (uncredited as the voice of Francis)

Production
This seventh and final entry in the Francis the Talking Mule series was made without most of the key creative personnel from the earlier films. Leonard Maltin, in his Movie Guide, quotes Donald O'Connor on quitting the series: "When you've made six pictures and the mule still gets more fan mail than you do...." Director Lubin and Chill Wills were also absent, replaced respectively by Charles Lamont and voice actor Paul Frees, who did a close approximation of Wills' voice as Francis.

Mickey Rooney replaced Donald O'Connor as a new but similar character, David Prescott. According to his autobiography, Rooney was originally considered for a United Artists Francis feature film with his company Rooney Inc optioning and then turning down the property  before Universal acquired the rights.

Rooney's casting was announced in January 1956.

Charles Lamont was announced as the film's director some weeks later.

Chill Wills wanted more money than Universal were willing to play, so the studio auditioned various voice actor replacements, including Mel Blanc, before settling on Paul Frees.

The film made no attempt at explaining why Francis left original sidekick Peter Stirling. In the script Francis says he decided to befriend reporter Prescott because "I once lived on a farm owned by Prescott's uncle and wanted to protect his nephew out of respect for the deceased." With the original elements missing, the film, a standard tale of fake ghosts and gangsters, was poorly received; it was widely reviewed as the weakest entry in the series.

Home media
The original film, Francis (1950), was released in 1978 as one of the first-ever titles in the new LaserDisc format, DiscoVision Catalog #22-003. It was then re-issued on LaserDisc in May 1994 by MCA/Universal Home Video (Catalog #: 42024) as part of an Encore Edition Double Feature with Francis Goes to the Races (1951).

The first two Francis films were released again in 2004 by Universal Pictures on Region 1 and Region 4 DVD, along with the next two in the series, as The Adventures of Francis the Talking Mule Vol. 1. Several years later, Universal released all 7 Francis films as a set on three Region 1 and Region 4 DVDs, Francis The Talking Mule: The Complete Collection.

See also
List of American films of 1956

References

External links

1956 films
1950s comedy horror films
American comedy horror films
American black-and-white films
1950s English-language films
Films directed by Charles Lamont
Films scored by Henry Mancini
Films scored by Frank Skinner
Films scored by Herman Stein
Universal Pictures films
1956 comedy films
Films about donkeys
1950s American films
Haunted House